This is an incomplete list of megalithic monuments in County Cork, Ireland.

 Ardgroom
 Beenalaght
 Bohonagh
 Carrigagulla
 Drombeg stone circle
 Glantane East
 Kealkill stone circle
 Knocknakilla megalithic complex
 Labbacallee wedge tomb
 Templebryan Stone Circle

See also
 Stone circles
 List of stone circles
 List of axial multiple-stone circles
 List of axial five-stone circles

 
 
Megalithic monuments